During the 2003–04 Belgian football season, Club Brugge competed in the Belgian First Division.

Season summary
Club Brugge failed to defend their title. Despite a famous win over reigning champions A.C. Milan, they also failed to progress from their Champions League group. A third-place finish in the group was enough for the club to continue their European campaign in the UEFA Cup, although they were soon knocked out in the fourth round.

First-team squad
Squad at end of season

Reserve squad

Results

Champions League

Third qualifying round

Borussia Dortmund 3–3 Club Brugge on aggregate. Club Brugge won 4–2 on penalties.

Group stage

UEFA Cup

Third round

Club Brugge won 1–0 on aggregate.

Fourth round

Bordeaux won 4–1 on aggregate.

Transfers

In
 Victor Simões – Germinal Beerschot

References

Club Brugge KV seasons
Club Brugge